Ivan Pavlovich Laveykin (2 August 1921 — 2 December 1986) was a Soviet fighter pilot during World War II. Awarded the title Hero of the Soviet Union on 24 August 1943 for his initial victories, he went on to achieve a final tally of 24 solo shootdowns.

References 

1921 births
1986 deaths
Soviet World War II flying aces
Heroes of the Soviet Union
Recipients of the Order of Lenin
Recipients of the Order of the Red Banner
Recipients of the Order of Alexander Nevsky
Recipients of the Order of the Red Star